Tregatillian is a hamlet immediately east of St. Columb Major in Cornwall, England, United Kingdom. The area is currently the site of a few traditional Cornish houses and a large residential mobile home site, Tregatillian Homes Park.

Notable residents
Author Cyril Bencraft Joly once lived in the village.

References

Hamlets in Cornwall
St Columb Major